Tsinghua University (abbr. THU) is a national public research university in Beijing, China. The university is funded by the Ministry of Education. The university is a member of the C9 League, Double First Class University Plan, Project 985, and Project 211. Since its establishment in 1911, it has produced many notable leaders in science, engineering, politics, business, academia, and culture.

The campus of Tsinghua University is situated in northwest Beijing on the site of the former imperial gardens of the Qing Dynasty, and surrounded by a number of historical sites.At present, the university has 21 schools and 59 departments with faculties in science, engineering, humanities, law, medicine, history, philosophy, economics, management, education and art. The university has more than 300 research institutions. Among the university's research labs are the Tsinghua National Laboratory for Information Science and Technology, the State Key Laboratory of Precision Measuring Technology and Instruments and the National Engineering Laboratory for Digital Television.  By August 2022,the campus area of the school is 460.19 hectares, with 59270 students. 

 Tsinghua University ranked 14th in the world by the 2023 QS World University Rankings and 16th globally by the 2022 Times Higher Education World University Rankings. In 2021, Tsinghua ranked first in the Asia-Pacific region by THE Asia University Rankings and the U.S. News & World Report.

History

Early 20th century (1911–1949) 

Tsinghua University was established in Beijing during a tumultuous period of national upheaval and conflicts with foreign powers which culminated in the Boxer Rebellion, an uprising against foreign influence in China. After the suppression of the revolt by a foreign alliance including the United States, the ruling Qing dynasty was required to pay indemnities to alliance members. US Secretary of State John Hay suggested that the US$30 million Boxer indemnity allotted to the United States was excessive. After much negotiation with Qing ambassador Liang Cheng, US president Theodore Roosevelt obtained approval from the United States Congress in 1909 to reduce the indemnity payment by US$10.8 million, on the condition that the funds would be used as scholarships for Chinese students to study in the United States.

Using this fund, the Tsinghua College was established in Beijing, on 29 April 1911 on the site of a former royal garden to serve as a preparatory school for students the government planned to send to the United States. Faculty members for sciences were recruited by the YMCA from the United States, and its graduates transferred directly to American schools as juniors upon graduation. The motto of Tsinghua, "Self-Discipline and Social Commitment", was derived from a 1914 speech by prominent scholar and faculty member Liang Qichao, in which he quoted the I Ching to describe a notion of the ideal gentleman.

In 1925, the school established its own four-year undergraduate program and started a research institute on Chinese studies. In 1928, Tsinghua changed its name to National Tsing Hua University.

During the Second Sino-Japanese War, many Chinese universities were forced to evacuate their campuses to avoid the Japanese invasion. In 1937, Tsinghua University, along with Peking University and Nankai University, merged to form the Changsha Temporary University in Changsha, which later became the National Southwestern Associated University in Kunming, Yunnan province. With the surrender of occupying Japanese forces at the end of World War II, Tsinghua University resumed operations in Beijing.

Later 20th century (post-1949) 
After the end of the Chinese Civil War in 1949, China experienced a communist revolution leading to the creation of the People's Republic of China. Tsinghua University's then president Mei Yiqi, along with many professors, fled to Taiwan with the retreating Nationalist government. They established the National Tsing Hua Institute of Nuclear Technology in 1955, which later became the National Tsing Hua University in Taiwan, an institution independent and distinct from Tsinghua University.

In 1952, the Chinese Communist Party regrouped the country's higher education institutions in an attempt to build a Soviet style system where each institution specialized in a certain field of study, such as social sciences or natural sciences. Tsinghua University was streamlined into a polytechnic institute with a focus on engineering and the natural sciences.

From 1966 to 1976, China experienced immense sociopolitical upheaval and instability during the Cultural Revolution. Many university students walked out of classrooms at Tsinghua and other institutions, and some went on to join the Red Guards, resulting in the complete shutdown of the university as faculty were persecuted or otherwise unable to teach. It was not until 1978, after the Cultural Revolution ended, that the university began to take in students and re-emerge as a force in Chinese politics and society.

In the 1980s, Tsinghua evolved beyond the polytechnic model and incorporated a multidisciplinary system emphasizing collaboration between distinct schools within the broader university environment. Under this system, several schools have been re-incorporated, including Tsinghua Law School, the School of Economics and Management, the School of Sciences, the School of Life Sciences, the School of Humanities and Social Sciences, the School of Public Policy and Management, and the Academy of Arts and Design.

In 1996, the School of Economics and Management established a partnership with the Sloan School of Management at the Massachusetts Institute of Technology. One year later, Tsinghua and MIT began the MBA program known as the Tsinghua-MIT Global MBA.

In 1998, Tsinghua became the first Chinese university to offer a Master of Laws (LLM) program in American law, through a cooperative venture with the Temple University Beasley School of Law.

21st century 
Tsinghua alumni include the current General Secretary of the Chinese Communist Party and paramount leader of China, Xi Jinping '79, who graduated with a degree in chemical engineering, along with the CCP General Secretary and former Paramount Leader of China Hu Jintao '64, who graduated with a degree in hydraulic engineering. In addition to its powerful alumni, Tsinghua has a reputation for hosting globally prominent guest speakers, with international leaders Bill Clinton, Tony Blair, Henry Kissinger, Carlos Ghosn, and Henry Paulson having lectured to the university community.

As of 2018, Tsinghua University consists of 20 schools and 58 university departments, 41 research institutes, 35 research centers, and 167 laboratories, including 15 national key laboratories. In September 2006, the Peking Union Medical College, a renowned medical school, was renamed "Peking Union Medical College, Tsinghua University" although it and Tsinghua University are technically separate institutions. The university operates the Tsinghua University Press, which publishes academic journals, textbooks, and other scholarly works.

Through its constituent colleges, graduate and professional schools, and other institutes, Tsinghua University offers more than 82 bachelor's degree programs, 80 master's degree programs and 90 PhD programs.

In 2014, Tsinghua established Xinya College, a residential liberal arts college, as a pilot project to reform undergraduate education at the university. Modeled after universities in the United States and Europe, Xinya combines general and professional education in a liberal arts tradition, featuring a core curriculum of Chinese and Western literature and civilization studies and required courses in physical education and foreign languages. Furthermore, while most Tsinghua undergraduates must choose a specific major upon entrance, Xinya students declare their majors at the end of freshman year, enabling them to explore several different fields of study.

In 2016, Schwarzman Scholars was established with almost US$400 million endowment by Steven Schwarzman, the chairman and CEO of the Blackstone Group and other multinational corporations and global leaders. Schwarzman Scholars annually selects 100-200 scholars across the world to enroll in a one-year fully-funded master's degree leadership program designed to cultivate the next generation of global leaders. 40% students are selected from the United States, 20% students are selected from China, 40% are selected from rest of the world. These scholars reside on the university campus at Schwarzman College, a residential college built specifically for the program.

In 2016, Tsinghua's expenditures were RMB 13.7 billion (US$3.57 billion at purchasing power parity), the largest budget of any university in China.

According to a 2018 Financial Times report, Tsinghua University has been linked to cyber-espionage.

Academics
Tsinghua University engages in extensive research and offers 51 bachelor's degree programs, 139 master's degree programs, and 107 doctoral programs through 20 colleges and 57 departments covering a broad range of subjects, including science, engineering, arts and literature, social sciences, law, medicine. Along with its membership in the C9 League, Tsinghua University affiliations include the Association of Pacific Rim Universities, a group of 50 leading Asian and American universities, Washington University in St. Louis's McDonnell International Scholars Academy, a group of 35 premier global universities,  and the Association of East Asian Research Universities, a 17-member research collaboration network of top regional institutions. Tsinghua is an associate member of the Consortium Linking Universities of Science and Technology for Education and Research (CLUSTER). Tsinghua is a member of a Low Carbon Energy University Alliance (LCEUA), together with the University of Cambridge and the Massachusetts Institute of Technology (MIT).

Admissions
Admission to Tsinghua for both undergraduate and graduate schools is extremely competitive. Undergraduate admissions for domestic students is decided through the gaokao, the Chinese national college entrance exam, which allows students to list Tsinghua University among their preferred college choices. While selectivity varies by province, the sheer number of high school students applying for college each year has resulted in overall acceptance rates far lower than 0.1% of all test takers.

Tsinghua University commands a very high rate of matriculation for accepted undergraduates. According to a report in 2008, 215 out of 300 students who placed within the top 10 in the 30 tested provinces and regions chose Tsinghua as their first choice school, and 21 out of the 30 top scorers in each province and region chose the university.

Admission to Tsinghua's graduate schools is also very competitive. Only about 16% of MBA applicants are admitted each year.

Research
Research at Tsinghua University is mainly supported by government funding from national programs and special projects. In the areas of science and technology, funding from these sources totals over 20 billion yuan, which subsidizes more than 1,400 projects every year conducted by the university. With the prospective increase of state investment in science and technology, research at Tsinghua is projected to receive more financial support from the state.

Each year, the university hosts the Intellectual Property Summer Institute in cooperation with Franklin Pierce Law Center of Concord, New Hampshire.

The scientific research institutions in Tsinghua University are divided into three categories, including government-approved institutions, institutions independently established by the university and institutions jointly established by the university and independent legal entities outside the university.

As of December 31, 2022, Tsinghua University has 428 university-level scientific research institutions in operation.

Rankings and reputation

General Ranking 

Tsinghua University is consistently ranked among the top universities in the Asia-Pacific according to major international university rankings.  Tsinghua University ranked No.1 in China, the whole of Asia-Oceania region and emerging countries according to the Times Higher Education, with its industry income, research, and teaching performance indicator placed at 1st, 4th and 9th respectively in the world. Internationally, Tsinghua was regarded as the most reputable Chinese university by the Times Higher Education World Reputation Rankings where, it has ranked 10th globally and 1st in the Asia-Pacific.

Tsinghua University ranked 10 among Global Innovative Universities according to the World's Universities with Real Impact (WURI) 2020 ranking released by United Nations Institute for Training and Research (UNITAR).

Since 2013, Tsinghua also topped the newly created regional QS BRICS University Rankings. Tsinghua graduates are highly desired worldwide; in the QS Graduate Employability Rankings 2017, Tsinghua was ranked 3rd in the world and 1st in the whole of Afro-Eurasia & Oceania region. In 2020, Tsinghua was ranked 15th in the world by QS World University Rankings, and ranked 6th globally and 1st in Asia in the QS Graduate Employability Rankings.

In 2022, U.S. News & World Report ranked Tsinghua at 1st in the Asia-Pacific and 23rd globally in its 2023 Best Global Universities Rankings.

Research Performance 
As of 2021, it ranked 3rd among the universities around the world by SCImago Institutions Rankings.  The Nature Index 2022 Annual Tables by Nature Research ranked Tsinghua 7th among the leading universities globally for the high quality of research publications in natural science.

For sciences in general, the 2022 CWTS Leiden Ranking ranked Tsinghua University 5th in the world only after Harvard, Stanford, MIT and Oxford, based on the number of their scientific publications belonging to the top 1% in their fields. In 2022, Clarivate Analytics ranked Tsinghua second in the whole of Afro-Eurasia & Oceania region after Chinese Academy of Sciences (CAS) and 5th in the world after (Harvard, CAS, Stanford and National Institutes of Health) for most cited researchers.

Subjects Rankings 
Tsinghua University ranked 10th globally (first in the Asia & Oceania region), and it ranked first globally in 13 fields, including "Artificial Intelligence", "Chemical Engineering", "Energy & Fuels", "Electrical & Electronics Engineering", "Engineering", "Environmental Engineering", "Information & Computing Sciences", "Materials Engineering", "Mechanical Engineering", " Nanoscience & Nanomaterials", "Robotics & Intelligent Systems", "Sustainable & Renewable Energy", and "Technology" by the University Ranking by Academic Performance. Tsinghua is ranked 1st in the Asia & Oceania region and 14th globally by the Performance Ranking of Scientific Papers for World Universities with specific fields and subjects, ranked number one globally, including "Chemical Engineering", "Chemistry", "Civil Engineering", "Computer Science", "Electrical Engineering", "Material Science" and "Physics".

As of 2021, it ranked 6th globally in "Education", 7th in "Clinical, pre-clinical and Health", 11th in "Business and Economics", 12th in "Computer Science", 13th in "Life Science", 17th in "Engineering and Technology", 18th in "Physical Science", 33th in "Social Science", 37th in "Law", and 40th in "Arts and Humanities" by the Times Higher Education Rankings by Subjects, which are historical strengths for Tsinghua.

Since 2015, Tsinghua University has overtaken the Massachusetts Institute of Technology to top the list of Best Global Universities for Engineering published by the U.S. News & World Report and as of 2021, is also ranked number one globally in Chemical Engineering, Computer Science, Engineering, Electrical and Electronic Engineering and Energy and Fuels. As of 2021, the U.S. News & World Report placed "Chemical Engineering", "Chemistry", "Civil Engineering", "Computer Science", "Condensed Matter Physics", "Electrical and Electronic Engineering", "Energy and Fuels", "Engineering", "Environment/Ecology", "Material Science", "Mechanical Engineering", "Nanoscience and Nanotechnology" "Physical Chemistry" and "Physics" at Tsinghua in the global Top 10 universities.

In the ARWU's Global Ranking of Academic Subjects 2020, Tsinghua ranks in the world's top five universities in "Telecommunication Engineering", "Instruments Science & Technology", "Civil Engineering", "Chemical Engineering", "Mechanical Engineering", "Nanoscience & Nanotechnology", "Energy Science & Engineering", and "Transportation Science & Technology" and falls within the global top 10 for "Electrical & Electronic Engineering", "Computer Science & Engineering", "Materials Science & Engineering", "Environmental Science & Engineering", and "Water Resources".

List of university departments and institutions

Department of Electrical Engineering 
The department of electrical engineering at Tsinghua University plays a pioneer role in state power grid of China. The research focus of the department include following areas.
 Power System and its Automation: Security, stability, control and marketization of power systems;
 High Voltage and Insulation Technique: High voltage insulation, over voltage and its protection, electromagnetic compatibility, equipment detection and high voltage measurement;
 Electric Machines and Electric Apparatus: Large-scale machines, special machines, motor systems in electrical vehicles, machine protection, high voltage switchgear;
 Power Electronics and Electrical Drive: Basic theory and topology research in power systems and industrial application, flexible AC transmission system, electrical machine drive and control, interface and application of renewable energy system, power quality;
 Theory and New Technology of Electrical Engineering: Basic theory of electromagnetic field and its numerical calculation, electromagnetic measurement, wireless transmission of power energy, fault diagnosis based on electromagnetic theory.

Department of Industrial Engineering 
Department of Industrial Engineering (Tsinghua IE) has three institutes: 
 Operations Research & Data Science
 System Operation and Digital Management
 Human Factors and Human-System Interaction

The Department also operates two university-level multi-disciplinary application-oriented institutes or centers: 
 Institute of Quality and Reliability
 Established jointly by Tsinghua University and State Administration for Market Regulation
 Institute of Industrial Culture
 Established jointly by Tsinghua University and Ministry of Industry and Information Technology
 Center for Smart Logistics and Supply Chain Management
 Established jointly by Tsinghua University and Jiaozhou City at Qingdao City, Shandong Province.

Department of Mathematical Sciences
The Department of Mathematical Sciences (DMS) was established in 1927.

In 1952, Tsinghua DMS was merged with the Peking University Department of Mathematical Sciences. Then in 1979 it was renamed "Department of Applied Mathematics", and renamed again in 1999 to its current title.

Tsinghua DMS has three institutes at present, the institute of Pure Mathematics which has 27 faculty members, the Institute of Applied Mathematics and Probability and Statistics which has 27 faculty members, and the Institute of Computational Mathematics and Operations Research which has 20 faculty members. There are currently about 400 undergraduate students and 200 graduate students.

Department of Precision Instrument
The Department of Precision Instrument was called the Department of Precision Instrument and Machine Manufacturing in 1960 when it was separated out from the Department of Machine Manufacturing to be an independent department. Later, in 1971, it was renamed the Department of Precision Instrument. The mission of the Department of Precision Instrument at Tsinghua University, as its dean said, is "supporting the national development and improving the people’s well-being."

Research
Research in the Department of Precision Instrument is divided to four main parts, led by its four research institutes: the Institute of Opto-electronic Engineering, the Institute of Instrument Science and Technology, the Engineering Research Center for Navigation Technology, and the Center for Photonics and Electronics. At the same time, the Department of Precision Instrument has three key laboratories: the State Key Laboratory of Tribology, the State Key Laboratory of Precision Measurement Technology and Instruments, and the Key Laboratory of High-accuracy Inertial Instrument and System. It also has two national engineering research centers, which are the National Engineering Research Center of Optical Disk and the CIMS National Engineering Research Center.

 The Institute of Opto-electronic Engineering
The Institute of Opto-electronic Engineering (IOEE) was established in 1958. It obtained the Chinese government's authorization to offer PhD program in 1981 and the approval to build the post-doctoral research site in 1988. The research of the IOEE covers opto-electronic instruments, precision metrology and measurement, modern optical information processing, the theory and components of binary optics, and the birefringent frequency-splitting lasers. Several famous scientists work in the IOEE, including Professor Guofan Jin, an academician of the Chinese Academy of Engineering, and Professor Kegong zhao, formerly the president of the Chinese National Institute of Metrology.

 The Institute of Instrument Science and Technology
The Institute of Instrument Science and Technology is the most important institute in the State Key Laboratory of Precision Measuring Technology and Instrument Science at Tsinghua University. The institute is equipped with advanced instruments and facilities, and its research has included every major area in modern instrument science and technology. Up to 2012, the institute have produced over 1500 publications, more than 100 patents, and acquired many significant awards.

 The Engineering Research Center for Navigation Technology
The Engineering Research Center for Navigation Technology is a relatively young institute in the Department of Precision Instrument which was established in 2000, with the intention to "[pursue] excellence in the research and development in the field of high-accuracy inertial instruments and navigation technology, as well as in MEMS inertial sensor fields, and to provide advanced training for future scientists and engineers in the field of inertial technology." Its research interests cover high-accuracy inertial instruments and navigation technology, MEMS inertial sensors and systems, and precise electro-mechanical control systems and their application. As of 2012, the area of the center is 2900 square meters, including approximately 550 square meters of clean rooms. Equipment and instruments in this center are worth over 50 million RMB (US$7.56 million).

 The Center for Photonics and Electronics
The center for Photonics and Electronics works on advanced laser and photonic technology. It houses 200 square meters of clean rooms and very modern laser instruments and equipment. The research of this Center covers solid-state laser technology, fiber laser technology, active optics technology, and laser detection technology. The center has published more than published more than 100 scientific papers including 40 indexed by SCI, has 18 national patents, and also frequently exchange visits and academic conferences with foreign scholars.

 The State Key Laboratory of Tribology
Under the authorization of China's State Planning Commission and Ministry of Education, the State Key Laboratory of Tribology (SKLT) was established in November, 1988. The present director of the SKLT is Professor Yonggang Meng, and the present chair of the Academic Committee of the SKLT is Professor Jue Zhong, who is also a member of Chinese Academy of Engineering.

The SKLT has one central laboratory and four sub-laboratories. It has been awarded numerous awards, including "two National Natural Science Awards, two National Invention Awards, one National Award for Science and Technology Progress, two National Excellent Science Book Awards, 25 awards from ministries or provinces of China, Edmond E. Bisson Award in 2003 from STLE, the 2008 PE Publishing Prize by the Editor and Editorial Board of the Journal of Engineering Tribology." Moreover, China's Ministry of Education recognized the SKLT as one of the creative groups in 2005, and the National Natural Science Foundation of China recognized the SKLT as one of the creative research groups in 2007. The TRibology Science Fund of the Key Laboratory of Tribology cooperates with National Natural Science Foundation of China in founding research projects in various applied sciences and technologies.

 The State Key Laboratory of Precision Measurement Technology and Instruments
Established in 1995, The State Key Laboratory of Precision Measurement Technology and Instruments is a joint laboratory of Tsinghua University and Tianjin University. It is a national key laboratory with two recognized national first-level key disciplines and their second-class disciplines. The research of The State Key Laboratory of Precision Measurement Technology and Instruments can be categorized into four major parts: laser and optoelectric measurement technology, sensing and information measurement technology, micro- and nano- measurement and fabrication technology, and quality control in manufacturing technology.

 The Key Laboratory of High-accuracy Inertial Instrument and System
The Key Laboratory of High-accuracy Inertial Instrument and System was established with the intention to support the research in the Engineering Research Center for Navigation Technology. Since its establishment, it has won 5 provincial and ministerial level scientific awards.

Education
Currently, there are two disciplines in the Department of Precision Instrument: the discipline of the instrumental science and technology of precision instrument and mechanology and the discipline of optical engineering.

There are six teaching laboratories or centers which serve significant roles in undergraduate and graduate education in the Department of Precision Instrument. They are:
 The Teaching Lab of Manufacturing Engineering
 The CAD Teaching Centre
 The Engineering Graphics Teaching Laboratory
 The Creative Machine Design Teaching Laboratory
 The Experimentation Teaching Center for Measurement and Control Technology
 The Teaching Laboratory of Optics and Length Measurement
The department provides more than 40 courses of the undergraduate level and 25 courses of the graduate level. As of 2012, 284 undergraduates, 152 postgraduates, and 219 doctoral students were studying or working in the department.

School of Life Sciences 
School of Life Sciences was first established in 1926 under the name Department of Biology. Botanist Qian Chongshu took up the first dean.

During the nationwide reorganization of universities in the early 1950s, the Department of Biology was merged into other universities, namely Peking University etc., resulting in a vacancy in the field of biological research in Tsinghua for almost 30 years.

In June 1984, decisions were made about the reestablishment of the Department of Biology, and the department officially reopened in September. During the reestablishment the Department of Biology of Peking University, the Institute of Biophysics of Chinese Academy of Sciences, and many other institutes as well as biologists provided valuable support and help. The department changed its name to the current name in September 2009. As of 2013, structural biologist and foreign associate of National Academy of Sciences of United States Dr. Yigong Shi is the current dean of School of Life Sciences. The school currently has 38 professors, around 600 undergraduates (including the candidates of Tsinghua University - Peking Union Medical College joint MD program) and 200 graduate students.

Peking Union Medical College

The Peking Union Medical College was established in 1917 by the Rockefeller Foundation and was modeled on the US medical education system. Tsinghua first established its medical school in 2001 and in 2006, Tsinghua's medical school merged with the Peking Union Medical College renaming it "Peking Union Medical College, Tsinghua University". The school remains the top ranked medical school and general hospital in China according to CUCAS in 2015. The Peking Union Medical College is also the only medical school to be affiliated with the Chinese Academy of Medical Sciences. It runs one of the most competitive medical programs in the country, accepting 90 students a year into its 8-year MD program. Students in the 8-year program spend 2.5 years at Tsinghua studying premedical education before moving onto Peking Union Medical College to complete the last 5.5 years in clinical medicine, basic medical education and research.

School of Economics and Management 

The School of Economics and Management dates back to 1926, when Tsinghua University established its Faculty of Economics.

School of Journalism and Communication
The Tsinghua School of Journalism and Communication (TSJC) was established in April 2002. Its predecessor was Communication Studies in the Department of Chinese Language and Literature and its establishment of coincides with the development of media increasingly influencing world affairs in a time of fast-growing globalization. The school's research fields include International Communication, Film and Television Studies, New Media Studies, Media Operation and Management, and Business Journalism and are based on comprehensive academic research in journalism and communication theories. The objective of the school is to bring full advantage of Tsinghua University's comprehensive academic structure to Chinese and international media, to construct a first-rate discipline in journalism and communication studies, to cultivate talented professionals in the field and to explore advanced concepts in journalism and communication. The school also offers a two-year graduate program in international business journalism, sponsored by Bloomberg L.P. and the International Center for Journalists (ICFJ), that trains talented students and media professionals from around the globe in financial media and corporate communication.

The school has five research-oriented centers to organize and conduct academic research activities. They are: Center for International Communications Studies, Center for New Media Studies, Center for Film and Television Studies, Center for Media Management Studies and Center for Cultural Industry Studies.

School of Law 

The legal studies at Tsinghua University can be dated back to the "Tsinghua College" era (1911-1929), where many students were sent to universities in western countries for legal studies. Graduating from institutions such as Columbia, Yale, and Harvard, those Tsinghua alumni have played an important role in areas of law and diplomacy. Famous legal scholars Tuan-Sheng Ch'ien, Yan Shutang (燕树棠), Wang Huacheng (王化成), Kung Chuan Hsiao (萧公权), Pu Xuefeng (浦薛凤), Mei Ju'ao (梅汝璈), Xiang Zhejun (向哲浚) and diplomat Tang Yueliang (唐悦良) are all graduates from Tsinghua College or went to study abroad after passing exams in Tsinghua College.

Tsinghua University School of Law was established in 1929 after Tsinghua College was renamed Tsinghua University. Legal education in Tsinghua University at the time focused on international affairs and Chinese legal studies. Courses on political science and economics could also be found on students' curriculum. Before the Japanese army invaded Beijing in 1937, the School of Law developed greatly. Many Chinese legal scholars graduated during that era, including Wang Tieya (王铁崖), Gong Xiangrui (龚祥瑞) and Lou Bangyan (楼邦彦).

In 1952, in response to the government policy of turning Tsinghua University into an engineering-focused university, the law school was dismissed; the faculty were appointed to other universities, including Peking University and Peking College of Political Science and Law (the predecessor of China University of Political Science and Law). Until 1995, there was no formal "school of law" at Tsinghua University, yet courses on law were still taught in Tsinghua University from the early 1980s.

On September 8, 1995, the Tsinghua University Department of Law was formally re-established; on April 25, 1999, the 88th anniversary of Tsinghua University, the university formally changed the department into the "School of Law". The "new" law school inherited the spirit of the "old" law school and has endeavored to add international factors to its students' curriculum. Due to its outstanding faculty members and students, the Tsinghua University School of Law has risen to become one of the leading law schools in China and since 2012, has been consistently ranked as the best or the second-best law school in mainland China by QS World University Rankings.

Graduate School at Shenzhen 

The Graduate School at Shenzhen was jointly founded by Tsinghua University and the Shenzhen Municipal Government. The school is directly affiliated with Tsinghua University in Beijing. The campus is located in the University Town of Shenzhen since 18 October 2003.
The Graduate School at Shenzhen, Tsinghua University, was jointly founded by Tsinghua University and the Shenzhen Municipal Government for cultivating top level professionals and carrying out scientific and technological innovations.
The academic divisions are the following:
 Division of Life Science and Health
 Division of Energy and Environment
 Division of Information Science and Technology
 Division of Logistics and Transportation
 Division of Advanced Manufacturing
 Division of Social Sciences and Management
 Division of Ocean Science and Technology

Student life

Student associations
Tsinghua University has more than 110 student associations covering five domains: science and technology, physical training, humanities, arts and public welfare. 

Some of associations includes: 
Students' Association for Global Affairs (SAGA)
Student Association of Educational Poverty Alleviation (SAEPA)
The Students' Performing Arts Club
Zijing Volunteer Service
Rural International Student Exchange (RISE)
Students' Association of Science and Technology
Photography Association
Foreign Languages Association
Association of Student International Communication (ASIC)
Tsinghua University Marching Band (THUMB)
Tsinghua Artificial Intelligence Association of International Students (TAIS)
Tsinghua University Student Blockchain Association (THUBA)

International students are encouraged to participate in various extracurricular activities and join the student associations of the university. FSAO also organizes extracurricular activities for international students, including welcome party for new students, New Year's party, graduation party, visits to Chinese cultural and historical destinations, sports competitions, etc.

Campus

The campus of Tsinghua University is located in northwest Beijing, in the Haidian district, which was designated for universities and other academic institutes.

It is located on the former site of Qing dynasty royal gardens and retains Chinese-style landscaping as well as traditional buildings, but many of its buildings are also in the Western-style, reflecting the American influence in its history. Along with its rival and neighbor the Peking University, it is known throughout China and the wider world for having one of the most beautiful campuses. Tsinghua University's campus was named one of the most beautiful college campuses in the world by a panel of architects and campus designers in Forbes in 2010; it was the only university in Asia on the list.

Numerous architects were involved in the designing of buildings on the campus.  American architect Henry Killam Murphy (1877-1954), a Yale graduate, designed early buildings such as the Grand Auditorium, the Roosevelt Memorial Gymnasium, the Science Building and the east side of the Old Library. Yang Tingbao designed the Observatory, the Life Sciences building, the Mingzhai of the student dormitory buildings and the middle and west side of the Old Library.  Shen Liyuan designed the Mechanical Engineering Hall, the Chemistry Hall and the Aviation Hall.  T. Chuang, a 1914 graduate of the University of Illinois at Urbana–Champaign, helped design the campus grounds of the Tsinghua University with influences of Neoclassical and Palladian architectural styles and architectures.  Other notable 20th-century Chinese architects such as Li Daozeng, Zhou Weiquan, Wang Guoyu and Guan Zhaoye have all designed various buildings on the Tsinghua University campus.

The university's Institute of Nuclear and New Energy Technology is on a separate campus in a northern suburb of Beijing.

The Tsinghua History Museum covers a construction area of 5,060 m2. A collection of old documents, pictures, artworks, maps, graphics, videos and music tells the visitors the history of Tsinghua University. The exhibition also pays tribute to the people who contributed to the development of the institution.

Notable people

Notable alumni 
Tsinghua University has produced many notable graduates, especially in political sphere, academic field and industry. Forbes has referred to Tsinghua as China's "power factory", citing the amount of senior Chinese politicians the university has produced.

Notable alumni who have held senior positions in Chinese politics include current general secretary and president of China, Xi Jinping, former general secretary and president of China Hu Jintao, former chairman of the National People's Congress Wu Bangguo, former premier Zhu Rongji, and the former first vice premier Huang Ju. This also includes politicians like Wu Guanzheng, former governor of the People's Bank of China Zhou Xiaochuan, former minister of finance Lou Jiwei, general Sun Li-jen, Liang Qichao, and more. Since 2016, Tsinghua graduates who have political prominence are disproportionately greater in number than graduates of other famous universities.

Notable alumni in the sciences include Nobel laureate Yang Chen Ning, who was awarded the Nobel Prize in Physics for his work with Tsung-Dao Lee on parity nonconservation of weak interaction; mathematician and winner of the Wolf Prize in Mathematics Shiing-Shen Chern, biologist Min Chueh Chang, theoretical physicist Zhou Peiyuan, astronomer Zhang Yuzhe, Leslie Ying, professor at the University at Buffalo and Editor-in-Chief of IEEE Transactions on Medical Imaging, James G. Dwyer Professor of Mechanical Engineering Qingyan Chen, architect and general director at the Beijing branch of the ISA Internationales Stadtbauatelier Yajin Zhang, Jianhua Lu, anthropologist Fei Xiaotong, sociologist and ethnologist Wu Wenzao, political scientist K. C. Hsiao, and Pan Guangdan.

Tsinghua is known for having educated the most billionaires of any university in China, and since 2017 counts 152 billionaires amongst its alumni. These include billionaires Sun Hongbin (real estate), chairman of Goertek Jiang Bin (components), Xu Hang (medical devices), and Zhang Zetian (e-commerce), among others.

Notable alumni in the arts and poetry include author Qian Zhongshu, Wen Yiduo, historian and poet Wang Guowei, and Chen Yinke.

Tsinghua clique

The term Tsinghua clique refers to a group of Chinese Communist Party politicians that have graduated from Tsinghua University. They are members of the fourth generation of Chinese leadership, and are purported to hold reformist and hesitantly pro-democratic ideas (a number have studied in the United States following graduation from Tsinghua, and some are said to be influenced by the reform ideals of Hu Yaobang). In the PRC, their ascendance to power began in 2008 at the 17th National Congress of the Chinese Communist Party.

See also 
 Tsinghua Shenzhen International Graduate School
 Tsinghua-Berkeley Shenzhen Institute
 Anti-Corruption and Governance Research Center
 Institute of Nuclear and New Energy Technology
 Peking Union Medical College
 National Tsing Hua University
 SMTH BBS
 Tsinghua clique
 Tsinghua Holdings
 Tsinghua University Press
 Education in the People's Republic of China
 High School attached to Tsinghua University
 List of colleges and universities in Beijing
 Wudaokou

Note

References

External links 

 Tsinghua University
 Tsinghua University 

Tsinghua University
Project 211
Project 985
Plan 111
Universities and colleges in Haidian District
Universities and colleges in Beijing
Architecture schools in China
Educational institutions established in 1911
1911 establishments in China
C9 League
Vice-ministerial universities in China